Wilhelm E. Heinrich Küster (16 August 1870 in Hanover, 1 Juli 1956 in Görlitz) was a German architect and town officer (1909–1933 as Stadtbaurat of Görlitz).

After his architectural studies (1890–1895) in high technical school in Hanover he worked in Elberfeld (until 1899), in 1905 in Oberhausen, 1905–1908 in Breslau (Wrocław), from 1909 in Görlitz.

References 
 Encyklopedia Wrocławia, Wrocław, Wydawnictwo Dolnośląskie, 2000, p. 436 (Polish)
 Karin Roth, Wohnungsbau in Görlitz zwischen den Weltkriegen [in:] Ines-Ulrike Rudolph, Susanne Jaeger: Görlitz-Zgorzelec. Strategien ohne Grenzen 2007, p. 90–96 (German)

19th-century German architects
1870 births
1956 deaths
20th-century German architects
Architects from Hanover